The Chhayanaut Sangeet Vidyatan is an institution devoted to Bengali culture, founded in Bangladesh in 1961.  As in the case of many similar organizations, it was established during Pakistani rule in Bangladesh to promote and nurture the cultural and musical heritage of Bengal. Every year, Chhayanaut arranges activities in order to celebrate the Pahela Boishakh, the first day of the Bengali new year.

In 2015 Chhayanaut was conferred with the prestigious Tagore Award for promoting cultural harmony.

References

External links

 Chhayanaut, in Banglapedia

Dhanmondi
Bangladeshi music
Cultural organisations based in Bangladesh
1961 establishments in East Pakistan